Kurt Nachmann (1915–1984) was an Austrian screenwriter and film actor and director.

Selected filmography

 The Singing House (1948)
 Espionage (1955)
 The Congress Dances (1955)
 Marriage Sanitarium (1955)
 Kaiserjäger (1956)
 If We All Were Angels (1956)
 Vienna, City of My Dreams (1957)
 War of the Maidens (1957)
 Arena of Fear (1959)
 Twelve Girls and One Man (1959)
 Jack and Jenny (1963)
 Don't Fool with Me (1963)
 The Last Ride to Santa Cruz (1964)
 Who Wants to Sleep? (1965)
 A Holiday with Piroschka (1965)
 Call of the Forest (1965)
 Manhattan Night of Murder (1965)
 Count Bobby, The Terror of The Wild West (1966)
 The Trap Snaps Shut at Midnight (1966)
 How to Seduce a Playboy (1966)
 Charley's Uncle (1969)
 Our Doctor is the Best (1969)
 House of Pleasure (1969)
 When You're With Me (1970)
 When the Mad Aunts Arrive (1970)
 Holidays in Tyrol (1971)
 Who Laughs Last, Laughs Best (1971)
 Always Trouble with the Reverend (1972)
 Don't Get Angry (1972)
 Trouble with Trixie (1972)
 Cry of the Black Wolves (1972)
My Daughter, Your Daughter (1972)
 The Twins from Immenhof (1973)
 The Bloody Vultures of Alaska (1973)
 Blue Blooms the Gentian (1973)
 Spring in Immenhof (1974)
 Zwei himmlische Dickschädel (1974)
 Vanessa (1977)
 Der Bockerer (1981)

References

Bibliography 
 Fritsche, Maria. Homemade Men In Postwar Austrian Cinema: Nationhood, Genre and Masculinity . Berghahn Books, 2013.

External links 
 

1915 births
1984 deaths
Austrian male film actors
Austrian film directors
Film people from Vienna
20th-century Austrian screenwriters
20th-century Austrian male writers